Sergei Viktorovich Chekmezov (born 10 October 1964) is a Russian professional football coach and a former player. He is the goalkeepers coach with FC Kaisar. He also holds Kazakhstani citizenship.

Club career
He made his professional debut in the Soviet Second League in 1982 for SKIF Alma-Ata.

Honours
 USSR Federation Cup winner: 1988.

See also
Football in Russia
List of football clubs in Russia

References

1964 births
Living people
Soviet footballers
Russian footballers
Association football goalkeepers
FC Zhetysu players
FC Shakhter Karagandy players
FC Kairat players
FC Torpedo Moscow players
FC Zhemchuzhina Sochi players
PFC Krylia Sovetov Samara players
FC Chernomorets Novorossiysk players
FC Kuban Krasnodar players
FC Sibir Novosibirsk players
FC KAMAZ Naberezhnye Chelny players
FC Vostok players
Soviet Top League players
Russian Premier League players